Wallace Miles (born August 1, 1989) is a Canadian football wide receiver who is currently unofficially retired. He played college football at North Carolina Agricultural and Technical State University and attended Westlake High School in Atlanta, Georgia. He has also been a member of the Detroit Lions, Winnipeg Blue Bombers, Ottawa Redblacks, Edmonton Eskimos and Toronto Argonauts.

Professional career

Detroit Lions
Miles signed with the Detroit Lions on May 14, 2012, after going undrafted in the 2012 NFL Draft. He was released by the Lions on August 31, 2012.

Winnipeg Blue Bombers
Miles was signed by the Winnipeg Blue Bombers on October 4, 2012.

Ottawa Redblacks
Miles was selected in the first round by the Ottawa Redblacks in the 2013 CFL Expansion Draft.

Edmonton Eskimos
Miles signed with the Edmonton Eskimos on February 12, 2015. He was released by the team on November 30, 2015.

Toronto Argonauts
Miles signed with the Toronto Argonauts on June 3, 2016.

References

External links
Just Sports Stats
NFL Draft Scout
North Carolina A&T Aggies bio
Ottawa Redblacks bio

Living people
1989 births
African-American players of American football
African-American players of Canadian football
American football wide receivers
Canadian football wide receivers
Detroit Lions players
Edmonton Elks players
North Carolina A&T Aggies football players
Ottawa Redblacks players
Winnipeg Blue Bombers players
Players of American football from Atlanta
Players of Canadian football from Atlanta
Toronto Argonauts players
21st-century African-American sportspeople
20th-century African-American people